Gnazim Archive of the Hebrew Writers Association in Israel (founded in 1950) is the largest Hebrew literature archive in the world. It is located in Beit Ariela.

History
The archive was established in 1951 by the Hebrew Writers Association in Israel, at the initiative of the writer and editor Asher Barash. After his death, the institute was named after him.

The purpose of the archive was to assemble and preserve the works of the Hebrew authors who lived and worked in different countries and in Israel. It contains manuscripts, letters, various personal documents and photographs, as well as a unique collection of recordings. It also holds manuscripts and letters of writers who were murdered in the Holocaust, among them David Vogel, Hillel Zeitlin and Shimon Dubnov. The archives of well-known Yiddish authors, including Zvi Eisenman, Mordechai Tzanin and the archive of David Hofstein, who was executed in the former Soviet Union by Stalin in 1952, are preserved in Gnazim.

Researchers, academics and members of the media from Israel and the world use the archive's treasures for their studies, books or film making.

More than 750 archival collections of writers, poets, essayists and playwrights from the late 19th century to the present, are preserved at Gnazim. Among the literary artists whose archives are kept in Gnazim are Judah Leib Gordon, Shaul Tchernichovsky,  Yosef Haim Brenner, Yehuda Burla, Rachel, Esther Raab, Leah Goldberg and Zelda and well-known contemporary writers including Yona Wallach, Avot Yeshurun, Yehuda Atlas, Nachum Gutman and Yonatan Ratosh.

Asher Barash wrote in 1951:

"In due time it will be an archive and gathering place for the entire Jewish creative work, for collecting writings by Jews in any language, first and foremost Yiddish."

References

External links 

 Official website (in Hebrew)
 Gnazim at the national library of israel web site(in Hebrew)
 Gnazim at אז - Project Map of archives in Israel(in Hebrew)
 Viennese Romance by David Vogel, review
 Princess Leah
 David Vogel's Lost Hebrew Novel, Viennese Romance at jstor

Archives in Israel
Literary archives
Hebrew-language literature
1951 establishments in Israel
Organizations based in Tel Aviv